The 2011 FIA European Truck Racing Championship was a multi-event motor racing championship for production based trucks held across Europe. The championship features a mix of professional motor racing teams and privately funded amateur drivers competing in highly modified versions of two-axle tractor units which conform to the technical regulations for the championship. It was the 27th European Truck Racing Championship season and began at Donington Park on April 22, with the finale at Le Mans on October 9 after ten events. The championship was won by Jochen Hahn, taking his first title.

Teams and drivers
Late entries in italics. Only trucks that were entered before Round 6 were eligible for points.

Calendar and winners

Championship standings

Drivers' Championship
Points were awarded on a 20, 15, 12, 10, 8, 6, 4, 3, 2, 1 basis to the top 10 finishers in races 1 & 3 of each meeting; and on a 10, 9, 8, 7, 6, 5, 4, 3, 2, 1 basis to the top 10 finishers in races 2 & 4 of each meeting. All scores counted towards the championship.

Teams' Championship
Points were awarded on the same scale as the Drivers' Championship, with non-registered teams being ignored.

External links 

TruckRacing.de 

European Truck Racing Championship seasons
European Truck Racing Championship
Truck Racing Championship